Albert Edward Ingleman (9 May 1886 – 23 December 1969) was an Australian rules footballer who played for Carlton in the Victorian Football League (VFL).

Ingleman, who was recruited from Brunswick, found it hard to get regular game time at Carlton in his preferred position in the centre. The man who often kept him out of the side, centreman Rod McGregor, broke his nose during the 1907 finals series which allowed Ingleman to make an appearance in the 1907 VFL Grand Final, which Carlton won.

References

Holmesby, Russell and Main, Jim (2007). The Encyclopedia of AFL Footballers. 7th ed. Melbourne: Bas Publishing.

1886 births
Australian rules footballers from Melbourne
Carlton Football Club players
Carlton Football Club Premiership players
1969 deaths
One-time VFL/AFL Premiership players
People from Brunswick, Victoria